No Bananas is a 10-episode television miniseries that aired on BBC TV in 1996. It is set in England during World War II. The cast was led by Alison Steadman, Michael Elwyn and Stephanie Beacham.

References

External links
 

BBC television dramas
1990s British television miniseries
World War II television drama series
1996 British television series debuts
1996 British television series endings
1990s British drama television series
English-language television shows
Television shows set in England